A Page of Honour is a ceremonial position in the Royal Household of the Sovereign of the United Kingdom. It requires attendance on state occasions, but does not now involve the daily duties which were once attached to the office of page. The only physical activity involved is usually carrying the long train of the King's robes.

This position is distinct from that of a page in the Royal Household, which is the senior rank of uniformed staff. It is usually a distinction granted to teenage sons of members of the nobility and gentry, and especially of senior members of the Royal Household. Pages of Honour participate in major ceremonies involving the British monarch, including coronations and the State Opening of Parliament.

Livery
Pages of Honour in England wear a scarlet frock coat with gold trimmings, a white satin waistcoat, white breeches and hose, white gloves, black buckled shoes and a lace cravat and ruffles. A sword is also worn with the outfit and a feathered three-cornered hat is provided. In Scotland the outfit is identical, but in green rather than scarlet (as seen periodically at the Thistle Service in Edinburgh). In Ireland, when Pages of Honour were attendant upon the King, Pages of Honour wore exactly the same uniform as at the English Court, except that the colour was St. Patrick's blue with silver lace.

At Coronations, the peers who carry regalia in the procession (and others with particular roles in the service) are expected to have their own pages in attendance. These pages are directed to wear "the same pattern of clothes as the Pages of Honour wear, but of the Livery colour of the Lords they attend... [except that] ...the Royal liveries being scarlet and gold, the use of this combination of colours is restricted to the Pages of Honour, and in the case of a Peer whose colours are scarlet and gold, for scarlet some variant, such as murrey or claret, should be used."

Pages of Honour

Charles II
1661–1662: Bevil Skelton
1661–1669: John Napier
1662–1668: Sidney Godolphin
1664–1665: Rupert Dillon
1665–1671?: Thomas Felton
1668–1678: John Berkeley
1668–1676: William Legge
1670: Charles Wyndham
1671–1685: Robert Killigrew
1671–1685: Aubrey Porter
1673–1678: John Prideaux
1674–1678: Henry Wroth
1678–1685: Thomas Pulteney
1680–1685: Sutton Oglethorpe
1681–1685: Charles Skelton

James II
1685: Thomas Windsor
1685: Reynold Graham
1685: James Levinston

William III

First Page of Honour
1689–1692?: Nicholas Needham
1692–1697: Carew Rawleigh
1697–1702: Robert Rich

Second Page of Honour
1689–1690: Arnold van Keppel
1690–1693?: Ernest Henry Ittersum
1695–1702: Thomas Harrison

Third Page of Honour
1689–1693?: Charles Dormer
1697–1702: William Colt

Fourth Page of Honour
1690–1693: Matthew Harvey 
1693–1697: George Feilding
1697–1702: Allan Wentworth

John Brockhuisen appears in the post-mortem accounts of the Board of Green Cloth as a page of honour to William III, but this may be an error, as he appears elsewhere as a pensioner after serving as Queen Mary's page of honour.

Anne

First Page of Honour
1702–1707: Hon. John Egerton
1707–1714: Hon. Richard Arundell

Second Page of Honour
1702–1709: Robert Blount
1709–1714: John Mordaunt

Third Page of Honour
1702–1708: John Gough
1708–1712: Charles Hedges
1712–1714: Thomas Murray

Fourth Page of Honour
1702–1710: Hon. Henry Berkeley
1710–1714: John Hampden

George I

First Page of Honour
1714–1727: Guildford Killigrew

Second Page of Honour
1714–1718: John Mordaunt
1718–1721: Emanuel Howe
1721–1727: Archibald Carmichael

Third Page of Honour
1714–1724: Thomas Murray
1724–1727: Sir William Irby, Bt

Fourth Page of Honour
1714–1724: Thomas Bludworth
1724–1727: Walter Villiers
1727: Henry Newton

George II

First Page of Honour
1727–1734: John FitzWilliam
1734–1739: Philip Roberts
1739–1745: Charles Chamberlayne
1745–1748: William Tryon
1748–1753: John Jenkinson
1753–1760: Hon. John Byng

Second Page of Honour
1727–1731: Henry Panton
1731–1735: Henry d'Arcy
1735–1739: John Ashburnham
1739–1744: Bluett Wallop
1744–1747: Hon. William Howe
1747–1751: Hon. George West
1751–1755: William Feilding
1755–1760: Hon. Henry Monckton

Third Page of Honour
1727–1731: Sir William Irby, Bt
1731–1737: Hon. John Boscawen
1737–1740: Charles Lee
1740–1746: Sandys Mill
1746–1747: Hon. George Bennet
1747–1752: Thomas Brudenell
1752–1757: William Middleton
1757–1760: Henry Wallop

Fourth Page of Honour
1727–1731: Archibald Carmichael
1731–1737: Thomas Style
1737–1741: Hon. Charles Roper
1741–1746: Hon. William Keppel
1746–1748: Charles Knollis
1748–1753: Harvey Smith
1753–1759: James Bathurst
1759–1760: John Wrottesley

George III

First Page of Honour
1760–1762: James Hamilton
1762–1769: Henry Monckton
1769–1777: Henry Greville
1777–1784: Henry Durell
1784–1793: John Neville
1793–1795: Henry Wilson
1795–1803: Charles Wilson
1803–1812: Charles Greville
1812–1815: Frederick Turner
1816–1818: John Bloomfield
1818–1820: Arthur Richard Wellesley 

Second Page of Honour
1760–1764: Henry Vernon
1764–1772: Thomas Thoroton
1772–1777: Richard Barrington
1777–1782: Henry Hall
1782–1794: Charles West
1794–1802: George Dashwood
1802–1803: Hon. Fitzroy Stanhope
1803–1808: vacant
1808–1809: Henry Buckley
1809–1815: Philip Stanhope
1816–1820: Hon. William Graves

Third Page of Honour
1760–1761: Hon. Edmund Boyle
1761–1768: John Manners
1768–1782: Francis Mackenzie
1782–1789: John Murray
1789–1794: Charles Jenkinson
1794–1800: William Dansey
1800–1804: Hon. Edward Irby
1804–1811: Henry Somerset
1812–1817: Charles Arbuthnot
1817–1820: Frederick Paget

Fourth Page of Honour
1760–1768: Doddington Egerton
1768–1776: Francis Chaplin
1776–1781: William Paul de Cerjat
1781–1786: Kenneth Howard
1786–1791: James Cockburn
1791–1794: Edward Draper
1794–1800: Charles Parker
1800–1804: William Wynyard
1804–1810: Richard Cumberland
1810–1816: Henry Murray
1816–1819: Frederick Culling–Smith
1819–1820: Arthur Torrens

Fifth Page of Honour
1760–1761: John Wrottesley
1773–1781: George Bristow
1781–1782: John Murray

George IV

First Page of Honour
1820–1821: Arthur Richard Wellesley
1821–1826: Lord Frederick Paulet
1826–1828: William Hervey-Bathurst
1828–1830: Henry d'Aguilar

Second Page of Honour
1820–1823: Frederick Paget
1823–1826: William Burton
1826–1830: Frederick Hamilton

Third Page of Honour
1820–1824: Charles Bagot 
1824–1830: Arthur William FitzRoy Somerset 

Fourth Page of Honour
1820–1825: Arthur Torrens
1825–1830: Joseph Hudson

William IV

First Page of Honour
1830–1835: Henry d'Aguilar
1835–1837: Charles Ellice

Second Page of Honour
1830–1831: Frederick Hamilton
1831–1837: Frederick Stephenson

Third Page of Honour
1830–1832: Arthur Somerset
1832–1837: Lord Hay

Fourth Page of Honour
1830: Joseph Hudson
1830–1837: Hon. Adolphus Graves
1837: James Cowell

Victoria

First Page of Honour
1837–1839: Charles Ellice
1839–1844: Charles Wemyss
1844–1852: George Gordon
1852–1859: Henry Farquharson
1859–1862: Edmund Boyle
1862–1869: Hon. Spencer Jocelyn
1869–1871: Hon. Frederick Bruce
1871–1876: Victor Biddulph
1876–1881: Hon. Victor Spencer
1881–1884: Percy Cust
1884–1890: Eric Thesiger
1890–1894: Hon. Maurice Drummond
1894–1901: Josslyn Egerton
1901–1901: John Bigge

Second Page of Honour
1837–1840: George Cavendish
1840–1847: Henry Byng
1847–1853: Alfred Crofton
1853–1861: Charles Phipps
1861–1867: Arthur Paget
1867–1874: George Grey
1874–1877: Laurence Drummond
1877–1882: Albert Wellesley
1882–1887: Arthur Ponsonby
1887–1892: Victor Wellesley
1892–1895: Albert Clarke
1895–1899: Hon. John Henniker–Major
1899–1901: The Viscount Torrington

Third Page of Honour
1837–1839: Lord Kilmarnock
1839–1841: Hon. Adolphus Chichester
1841–1856: Archibald Stuart-Wortley
1856–1862: Viscount Cuffe Castle
1862–1868: Hon. Arthur Lyttleton
1868–1874: Hon. George Somerset
1874–1879: Count Edward Gleichen
1879–1883: Frederic Kerr
1883–1893: Gerald Ellis
1893: Arthur Wood
1893–1896: Sir Albert Seymour, Bt.
1896–1901: Hon. Ivan Hay

Fourth Page of Honour
1837–1840: James Cowell
1840–1845: Herbert Wilson
1845–1852: William Forbes
1852–1859: George Macpherson
1859–1866: Henry Loftus
1866–1870: Hon. Frederick Stopford
1870–1876: Arthur Hardinge
1876–1877: George Macdonald
1877–1881: Hon. Francis Hay
1881–1883: George Byng
1883–1886: Hon. Edward FitzRoy
1886–1890: Cyril Stopford
1890–1895: Geoffrey Stewart
1895–1897: Alexander Wood
1897–1901: Harold Festing

Edward VII

First Page of Honour
1901–1904: John Bigge
1904–1910: Hon. Edward Knollys

Second Page of Honour
1901–1903: The Viscount Torrington
1903–1908: Donald Davidson
1908–1910: Anthony Lowther

Third Page of Honour
1901: Hon. Ivan Josselyn Hay
1901–1907: Hon. Victor Alexander Spencer
1907–1910: George Lane

Fourth Page of Honour
1901–1902: Harold Festing
1902–1906: Nigel Legge
1906–1908: Edward Hardinge
1908–1910: Walter Campbell

George V

First Page of Honour
1910–1911: Hon. Edward Knollys
1911–1917: Edward Reid
1917–1921: Iain Murray
1921–1924: The Earl Erne
1924–1927: Allan Mackenzie
1927–1932: Alfred Hesketh-Prichard
1932–1936: Patrick Crichton

Second Page of Honour
1910–1913: Anthony Lowther
1913–1916: Hon. Thomas Brand
1916–1919: Edward Ponsonby
1919–1925: George Godfrey-Faussett
1925–1932: Neville Wigram
1932–1935: Colin Mackenzie
1935–1936: The Lord Herschell

Third Page of Honour
1910: George Lane
1910–1914: Victor Harbord
1914–1917: Gerald Lloyd-Verney
1917–1919: Richard Dawnay
1919–1923: Henry Hunloke
1923–1927: Michael Adeane
1927–1931: Jock Colville
1931–1935: Viscount Errington
1935–1936: George Seymour

Fourth Page of Honour
1910–1913: Walter Campbell
1913–1915: Assheton Curzon-Howe
1915–1917: Francis Stonor
1917–1921: Guy Dugdale
1921–1924: George Gordon-Lennox
1924–1930: Harry Legge-Bourke
1930–1933: Douglas Gordon
1933–1936: George Hardinge

Edward VIII

First Page of Honour
1936: Patrick Crichton

Second Page of Honour
1936: The Lord Herschell

Third Page of Honour
1936: George Seymour

Fourth Page of Honour
1936: George Hardinge

George VI

First Page of Honour
1936–1940: Robert Eliot
1940–1948: None due to the Second World War
1948–1950: Lord Hyde
1950–1952: Hon. Charles Wilson
1952: The Earl Erne

Second Page of Honour
1935–1940: Baron Herschell
1940–1947: None due to the Second World War
1947–1951: James Ogilvy
1951–1952: Jonathan Peel

Third Page of Honour
1936–1940: George Seymour
1940–1946: None due to the Second World War
1946–1949: Bernard Gordon Lennox
1949–1952: Henry Seymour

Fourth Page of Honour
1936–1938: George Hardinge
1938–1939: David Stuart
1939–1946: None due to the Second World War
1946–1950: George Paynter
1950–1952: Michael Anson

Elizabeth II

First Page of Honour
1952–1954: The Earl Erne
1954–1956: Hon. Anthony Tryon
1956–1959: Sir Mark Palmer, 5th Baronet, whose mother was Lady Abel Smith, a lady-in-waiting to the Queen.
1959–1962: Hon. Julian Hardinge
1962–1964: Earl of Lewes
1964–1965: Lord Scrymgeour
1965–1967: Douglas Gordon
1967–1970: Christopher Abel Smith, whose mother was Lady Abel Smith, a lady-in-waiting to the Queen, and who is a half-brother of Sir Mark Palmer, 5th Baronet, First Page of Honour 1956–1959.
1970–1973: Louis Greig
1973–1976: Lord Leveson
1976–1978: John Ponsonby
1979–1980: Hon. Thomas Coke
1981–1983: James Basset
1983–1986: Hon. Edward Cecil
1986–1988: Benjamin Hamilton
1988–1990: Hon. Edward Tollemache
1991–1994: Edward Janvrin
1994–1996: Simon Ramsay
1996–1999: Lord Eskdaill
1999–2002: Lord Maltravers
2002–2004: Archibald Young
2004–2008: George FitzRoy
2008–2012: Jack Soames
2012–2015: Hon. Charles Armstrong-Jones
2015: Lachlan Legge-Bourke 

Second Page of Honour
1952–1954: Jonathan Peel
1954–1956: Edward Adeane
1956–1957: Duncan Davidson
1957–1958: Andrew Gordon
1960–1962: David Hughes-Wake-Walker
1962–1963: Viscount Ipswich
1963–1964: Heneage Legge-Bourke
1964–1966: Christopher Tennant
1966–1968: Hon. Harry Fane
1968–1969: John Maudslay
1969–1971: Hon. David Hicks-Beach
1971–1973: Simon Rhodes
1973–1974: David Bland
1974–1976: Earl of Rocksavage
1976–1979: Charles Loyd
1979–1981: Viscount Carlow
1981–1983: Marquess of Lorne
1983–1984: Hon. Hugh Crossley
1984–1988: Malcolm Maclean
1988–1991: Hon. Charles Tryon
1991–1995: James Bowes-Lyon
1995–1997: Hon. William Vestey
1997–2000: Lord Dunglass
2000–2004: Hon. John Bowes-Lyon
2004–2008: Viscount Garnock
2008–2012: Lord Stanley
2012–2015: Viscount Aithrie 
2015–2019: Hon. Augustus Stanhope
2019–2022: Lord Claud Hamilton

Third Page of Honour
1952–1953: Henry Seymour
1953–1955: Viscount Carlow
1955–1956: John Aird
1956–1958: Lord Ardee
1958–1961: Guy Nevill
1961–1964: David Penn
1964–1966: Edward Hay
1966–1969: Nicholas Bacon
1969–1973: Hon. George Herbert
1973–1975: Napier Marten
1975–1976: James Hussey
1976–1978: William Oswald
1978–1979: John Heseltine
1979–1981: James Maudslay
1981–1984: Guy Russell
1984–1987: Harry Legge-Bourke
1987–1989: Hon. Robert Montgomerie
1989–1992: Rowley Baring
1992–1995: Rory Penn
1995–1998: Thomas Howard
1998–2001: Viscount Chewton
2001–2004: Viscount Garnock
2005–2008: Arthur Hussey
2008–2009: Michael Ogilvy
2009–2015: Arthur Chatto
2015-2018: Marquess of Lorne
2018–2022: Robert Bruce

Fourth Page of Honour
1952–1953: Michael Anson
1953–1956: Hon. Simon Scott
1956–1957: Earl of Shelburne
1957–1959: Oliver Russell
1959–1962: Charles Strachey
1962–1964: Simon Rasch
1964–1966: Richard Ford
1966–1968: James Colville
1968–1971: Alexander Colville
1971–1974: Lord Ogilvy
1974–1977: Edward Gordon-Lennox
1977–1979: Viscount Althorp
1979–1980: Tyrone Plunket
1980–1982: Richard Lytton-Cobbold
1982–1984: Marquess of Hamilton
1984–1988: Piers Blewitt
1988–1990: Lord Hyde
1990–1993: Hon. Alexander Trenchard
1993–1996: Hon. Edward Lowther
1996–1998: Earl Percy
1998–2003: Lord Carnegie
2003–2006: Alexander William Malise Fraser
2006–2008: Henry Naylor
2008–2012: Andrew Leeming
2012–2016: Hugo Bertie 
2016-2018: Thomas Hallé
2018–2022: Max Bowen

Charles III

First Page of Honour

Second Page of Honour
2022–present: Lord Claud Hamilton

Third Page of Honour
2022–present: Robert Bruce

Fourth Page of Honour
2022–present: Max Bowen

References

Positions within the British Royal Household